Rapala melida or Frustorfer's Flash, is a butterfly in the family Lycaenidae. It was described by Hans Fruhstorfer in 1912. It is found in the Indomalayan realm.

Subspecies
R. m. melida (Borneo)
R. m. palawanica Schröder & Treadaway, 2000 (Philippines)

References

External links
Rapala at Markku Savela's Lepidoptera and Some Other Life Forms

Rapala (butterfly)
Butterflies described in 1912